Li Zhen (July 1924 – 7 April 2018) was a Chinese politician who served as Executive Vice Governor of Shandong Province and Chairman of the Shandong People's Congress.

Biography 
Li was born in July 1924 in Anqiu, Shandong Province. He joined the Communist Party of China in June 1939, during the Second Sino-Japanese War, and served in various party and military positions in Shandong. After the founding of the People's Republic of China. he served as Deputy Party Secretary of Jiaozhou Prefecture, Party Secretary of Dezhou Prefecture, Deputy Party Secretary of Shandong Province, Vice Governor and then Executive Vice Governor of Shandong. He then served as Chairman of the 6th, 7th, and 8th Shandong People's Congress, until his retirement in February 1998.

Li was a member of the 12th and 14th Congress of the Chinese Communist Party, and a member of the 6th, 7th, and 8th National People's Congress.

Li died on 7 April 2018 in Jinan, Shandong, at the age of 93.

References

1924 births
2018 deaths
People's Republic of China politicians from Shandong
Chinese Communist Party politicians from Shandong
Politicians from Weifang
Vice-governors of Shandong